Duncan Clark (1759-1808) was a Loyalist who became an influential figure in Halifax, Nova Scotia. Dr. Duncan Clarke, first and one of the longest serving head of Royal Naval Hospital Halifax (1795-1803). He served in the 82nd Regiment of Foot and arrived in Halifax in 1778. He was a member of the North British Society, eventually becoming president. He was a frequent patron of the Great Pontack (Halifax).  Clark also was the head of a Masonic Lodge for Saint John, New Brunswick and later in Nova Scotia. He was also a friend of John Halliburton (surgeon) of the doctor for Prince Edward, Duke of Kent and Strathearn.

References 

1759 births
1808 deaths
History of Nova Scotia
Loyalists who settled Nova Scotia